This is a List of National Historic Landmarks in Texas and other landmarks of equivalent landmark status in the state.  The United States' National Historic Landmark (NHL) program is operated under the auspices of the National Park Service, and recognizes structures, districts, objects, and similar resources according to a list of criteria of national significance. There are 49 current and one former NHLs in Texas.

Current National Historic Landmarks in Texas
The landmarks in Texas are distributed across 29 of the 254 counties in the state.  Nine of the sites are in Bexar County.

Key

|}
Notes

Former National Historic Landmark in Texas

See also

List of National Historic Landmarks by state
National Register of Historic Places listings in Texas
History of Texas
List of areas in the United States National Park System
List of National Natural Landmarks in Texas

References

External links 

National Historic Landmarks Program at the National Park Service
National Park Service listings of National Historic Landmarks

Texas
 
National Historic Landmarks